Ward Township is one of eleven townships in Randolph County, Indiana. As of the 2010 census, its population was 1,109 and it contained 495 housing units.

History
Ward Township was established in 1820.

Geography

Cities and towns
 Saratoga

Unincorporated towns
 Deerfield at 
 Randolph at 
 Stone at 
(This list is based on USGS data and may include former settlements.)

Education
Ward Township residents may obtain a free library card from the Winchester Community Public Library in Winchester.

References

External links
 Indiana Township Association
 United Township Association of Indiana

Townships in Randolph County, Indiana
Townships in Indiana